Plum Financial Services Limited was an Australian corporate superannuation administrator and provider of financial products and services, before Plum Super became a product of MLC in 2016. As of 2021, Plum Super is administered by MLC Wealth Management Services.

Plum administered over A$20 billion in funds under management on behalf of more than 80 medium and large Australian organisations and more than 230,000 members. Plum was purpose-built for the era of member investment choice.

Plum had offices in Melbourne and Sydney. Originally a joint venture between MLC and Vanguard Australia, it later became a wholly-owned part of the National Australia Bank.

In 2016, Plum Financial Services was absorbed into the broader wealth management division of National Australia Bank, ceasing to exist as a separate business. Plum's superannuation products continued to operate within NAB Wealth, and now continue within the IOOF since its 2021 acquisition of NAB's wealth business.

References

 http://www.nabgroup.com/0,,33427,00.html
 http://www.nabgroup.com/0,,33437,00.html
 http://www.nab.com.au/wps/wcm/connect/nab/nab/home/business_solutions/4/4/3

External links

Financial services companies established in 1998
Financial services companies of Australia
Lendlease
National Australia Bank
1998 establishments in Australia